Angus Morrison,  (born 1953) is a minister of the Church of Scotland who was Moderator of the General Assembly of the Church of Scotland 2015–2016. He had been nominated for the role a year earlier but withdrew because of ill health. He is an Honorary Chaplain to the Queen, appointed in 2006.

Early life and education
Morrison was born in Glencoe, Scotland, in 1953. His father worked for the Northern Lighthouse Board and, as a child, Morrison lived in various places around Scotland and went to school in Oban, Stromness and Edinburgh. He studied Classics and Divinity at the University of Glasgow, followed by studies at the Universities of Pisa and London. He studied for a doctorate (PhD) at New College of the University of Edinburgh.

Ordained ministry

Free Presbyterian Church of Scotland and Associated Presbyterian Churches
Highly unusually for a Moderator of the General Assembly of the Church of Scotland, Morrison was not ordained by the Church of Scotland. He was ordained by the Free Presbyterian Church of Scotland in 1979. He served as a minister in Oban between 1979 and 1986, and as a minister in Edinburgh between 1986 and 1989. During the latter period, he served as Moderator of the Free Presbyterian Church's Southern Presbytery.

Following a split in the Free Presbyterian Church in 1989 (in the aftermath of the decision of Lord Mackay of Clashfern to attend the Requiem Mass of a colleague), Morrison joined the Associated Presbyterian Churches (APC). He became minister of the Edinburgh congregation of the APC, serving from 1989 to 2000. He was also Moderator of the General Assembly of the APC during the 1998 to 1999 session.

Church of Scotland
In 2000, Morrison became a minister of the Church of Scotland. He served as minister of St Columba's Old Parish Church, Stornoway, before moving to Orwell and Portmoak Parish Church (in Perth and Kinross) in 2011. Within the Church of Scotland he served as the Moderator of the Presbytery of Lewis for the 2003 to 2004 session, Convener of the Mission and Discipleship Council (2005-2009) and Chaplain to the Lord High Commissioner (2005 and 2006).

On 29 October 2013 he was nominated to be Moderator of the General Assembly of the Church of Scotland for 2014–15. In March 2014, two months ahead of taking up the role, the Church of Scotland announced that Morrison had withdrawn his nomination as Moderator on grounds of ill health, Following this, John Chalmers (Principal Clerk to the General Assembly) was selected to be Moderator ahead of the 2014–15 session. On 28 October 2014 Morrison was again successfully nominated to be Moderator of the General Assembly of the Church of Scotland, for 2015–16.

Personal life
He can speak Gaelic and Italian as well as English. He is married and has four children.

References

External links
Church of Scotland press release, 29 October 2013
STV News, 29 October 2013
Church of Scotland press release, 28 October 2014
STV News, 28 October 2014

21st-century Ministers of the Church of Scotland
Living people
1953 births
Alumni of the University of Glasgow
People from Lochaber
University of Pisa alumni
Alumni of the University of London
Honorary Chaplains to the Queen
Alumni of the University of Edinburgh
Moderators of the General Assembly of the Church of Scotland
Ministers of the Free Presbyterian Church of Scotland